The Australia men's national under-21 field hockey team, represents Australia in international under-21 field hockey and at the Junior World Cup. The team is controlled by the governing body for field hockey in Australia, Hockey Australia, which is currently a member of the Oceania Hockey Federation (OHF) and the International Hockey Federation (FIH). The team's official nickname is the Burras.

The team's first recorded appearance was at the 1982 Junior World Cup, where the team won a silver medal.

The team's last appearance was during an eight nations tournament during June 2019 in Madrid, Spain.

History

Tournament Records

Team

Current squad
The following 19 players represented the Burras at the 2019 Eight Nations Tournament from 10–16 June, in Madrid, Spain.

References

Under-21
Field hockey
Men's national under-21 field hockey teams